The 2007 season was the 4th season of competitive football by Universidad San Martín de Porres.

Statistics

Appearances and goals

Competition Overload

Primera División Peruana 2007

Apertura 2007

Clausura 2007

Mid-season friendlies

Pre-season friendlies

Transfers

In

Out

External links 
 Everything about Deportivo Universidad San Martín
 Deportivo Universidad San Martín de Porres - season 2007

2007
2007 in Peruvian football